The Ford River Rouge complex (commonly known as the Rouge complex, River Rouge, or The Rouge) is a Ford Motor Company automobile factory complex located in Dearborn, Michigan, along the River Rouge, upstream from its confluence with the Detroit River at Zug Island.  Construction began in 1917, and when it was completed in 1928, it was the largest integrated factory in the world, surpassing Buick City, built in 1904.

It inspired the Île Seguin Renault factory in 1920, the GAZ factory built in the 1930s in the Soviet Union, as well as the later Hyundai factory complex in Ulsan, South Korea, which was developed beginning in the late 1960s.  Designed by Albert Kahn, River Rouge was designated as a National Historic Landmark District in 1978 for its architecture and historical importance to the industry and economy of the United States.

Structure
With its own docks in the dredged Rouge River,  of interior railroad track, its own electricity plant, and integrated steel mill, the titanic Rouge was able to turn raw materials into running vehicles within this single complex, a prime example of vertical-integration production.

Some of the River Rouge buildings were designed by architect Albert Kahn.  His Rouge glass plant was regarded at the time as an exemplary and humane factory building, with ample natural light provided through windows in the ceiling. Since the late 20th century, several buildings at the Rouge complex have been renovated and converted to "green" structures with a number of environmentally friendly features.

In the summer of 1932, through Edsel Ford's support, Mexican artist Diego Rivera was invited to study the facilities at the Rouge. These studies informed his set of murals known as Detroit Industry.

Production

The plant's first products were Eagle Boats, World War I anti-submarine warfare boats produced in Building B.  The original Building B, a three-story structure, is part of the legendary Dearborn Assembly Plant, which started producing Model A's in the late 1920s and continued production of Ford full-sized coupes and sedans through 2004.  After the war, production turned to Fordson tractors. Although the Rouge produced nearly all the parts of the Model T, assembly of that vehicle remained at Highland Park.  It was not until 1927 that automobile production began at the Rouge, with the introduction of the Ford Model A.

During World War II the Rouge complex produced jeeps, aircraft engines, aircraft components and parts, tires and tubes, armor plate, and tractors.

Other Rouge products included the 1932 Model B, the original Mercury, the Ford Thunderbird, Mercury Capri, and four decades of Ford Mustangs. The old assembly plant was idled with the construction and launch of a new assembly facility on the Miller Road side of the complex, currently producing Ford F-150 pickup trucks.

The River Rouge complex manufactured most of the components of Ford vehicles, starting with the Model T. Many of the vehicles were compiled into "knock-down kits", then sent by railroad to various branch assembly locations across the United States in major metropolitan cities to be locally assembled, using local supplies as necessary. After the 1960s, Ford began to decentralize manufacturing, building several factories in major metropolitan centers. The Rouge was downsized, with units (including the famous furnaces and docks) sold off to independent companies, many still operating independently to this day.

On May 26, 1937, a group of workers attempting to organize a union at the Rouge were severely beaten, an event later called the Battle of the Overpass. Peter E. Martin's respect for labor led to Walter Reuther, a UAW leader, allowing Martin to be the only Ford manager to retrieve his papers or gain access to the plant.

The Rouge was one of only three locations where Ford manufactured the Mustang; the other sites were Metuchen Assembly in Edison, New Jersey, and San Jose Assembly in Milpitas, California.

By 1987, only Mustang production remained at the Dearborn Assembly Plant (DAP).  In 1987 Ford planned to replace that car with the front wheel drive Ford Probe, but public outcry quickly turned to surging sales. With the fourth-generation Mustang a success, the Rouge was saved as well. Ford decided to modernize its operations. A gas explosion on February 1, 1999, killed six employees and injured two dozen more, resulting in the idling of the power plant. Michigan Utility CMS Energy built a state-of-the-art Power Plant across Miller Road to replace the electricity and steam production, as well as the blast furnace waste gas consumption of the original power plant. As it ended production, Dearborn Assembly Plant was one of six plants within the Ford Rouge Center. The plant was open from 1918 to May 10, 2004, with a red convertible 2004 Ford Mustang GT being the last vehicle built at the historic site. Demolition of the historic DAP facility was completed in 2008. All that remains is a 3000 place parking lot to hold light truck production from the new Dearborn Truck Plant.

Ford Rouge Center

Today, the Rouge site is home to Ford's Rouge Center. The new Dearborn Truck factory famously features a vegetation-covered roof and rainwater reclamation system designed by sustainability architect William McDonough. This facility is still Ford's largest factory and employs some 6,000 workers. Mustang production, however, has moved to the Flat Rock Assembly Plant in Flat Rock, Michigan.

Tours of the Rouge complex were a long tradition. Free bus tours of the facility began in 1924 and ran until 1980, at their peak hosting approximately a million visitors per year. They resumed in 2004 in cooperation with The Henry Ford Museum with multimedia presentations, as well as viewing of the assembly floor. The Ford Rouge Factory Tour had 148,000 visitors in 2017.

Hourly workers from both Ford and AK Steel facilities at the complex are represented by UAW Local 600.

A fleet of three Ford-owned Great Lakes freighters initially named for the Ford grandsons and later renamed for top company executives, was based at the River Rouge Plant.  The deckhouse of the SS Benson Ford was transported by crane barge to Put-in-Bay, Ohio and placed on an 18-foot cliff as a private home above Lake Erie.

In September, 2020 Ford announced construction of the new Rouge Electric Vehicle Center, where their electric vehicles will be produced. In 2021, the vehicle center opened, and Ford's first all electric truck, the Ford F-150 Lightning, will be the first vehicle model produced there.

Renovated architecture

In 1999, architect William McDonough entered into an agreement with Ford Motor Company to redesign its 85-year-old,  Rouge River facility. The sedum retains and cleanses rainwater and moderates the internal temperature of the building, saving energy.

The roof is part of an $18 million rainwater treatment system designed to collect and clean rainwater annually, sparing Ford from a $50 million mechanical treatment facility.

Current product made
Ford F-150 (1948–present)
Ford F-150 Lightning electric pickup (2022–present)

Former products made
Eagle-class patrol craft (1918–1919)
Fordson tractor (1921–1928)
Ford Model T parts only (1920s)
Ford Model A (1927–1932)
Ford Model B (1932–1934)
Ford Model 48 (1935–1936)
1937 Ford (1937–1940)
1941 Ford (1941–1942, 1946–1949)
1949 Ford (1949–1951)
1952 Ford (1952–1954)
Ford Fairlane (1955–1961)
Ford Thunderbird (1955–1957)
Ford Mustang (1964–2004)
Mercury Capri (1979–1986)
Mercury Cougar (1966–1973)

See also

Ford Piquette Avenue Plant

References

External links

River Rouge Factory Tour
Photos from the Rouge Steel mill

Historic American Engineering Record (HAER) documentation, filed under 3001 Miller Road, Dearborn, Wayne County, MI:

1928 establishments in Michigan
Automobile culture and history in Dearborn, Michigan
Buildings and structures in Dearborn, Michigan
Albert Kahn (architect) buildings
Ford factories
Historic American Engineering Record in Michigan
Historic districts on the National Register of Historic Places in Michigan
Industrial buildings and structures on the National Register of Historic Places in Michigan
Industrial buildings completed in 1928
Michigan State Historic Sites in Wayne County, Michigan
Motor vehicle assembly plants in Michigan
Motor vehicle manufacturing plants on the National Register of Historic Places
National Historic Landmarks in Metro Detroit
National Register of Historic Places in Wayne County, Michigan
Transportation buildings and structures on the National Register of Historic Places in Michigan